The Nea Ekklēsia ("New Church"; known in English as "The Nea") was a church built by Byzantine Emperor Basil I the Macedonian in Constantinople between 876 and 880. It was the first monumental church built in the Byzantine capital after the Hagia Sophia in the 6th century, and marks the beginning of the middle period of Byzantine architecture. It continued in use until the Palaiologan period. Used as a gunpowder magazine by the Ottomans, the building was destroyed in 1490 after being struck by lightning. No traces of it survive, and information about it derives from historical accounts and depictions.

History

Emperor Basil I was the founder of the Macedonian dynasty, the most successful in Byzantine history. Basil regarded himself as a restorer of the empire, a new Justinian, and initiated a great building program in Constantinople in emulation his great predecessor. The Nea was to be Basil's Hagia Sophia, with its very name, "New Church", implying the beginning of a new era.

The church was built under the personal supervision of Basil, in the southeastern corner of the Great Palace complex, near the location of the earlier tzykanistērion (polo field). Basil built another church nearby, the "Theotokos of the Pharos". The Nea was consecrated on 1 May 880 by Patriarch Photius, and dedicated to Jesus Christ, the archangel Michael (in later sources, Gabriel), the Prophet Elijah (one of Basil's favorite saints), the Virgin Mary and St Nicholas.

It is indicative of Basil's intentions for this church that he endowed it with its own administration and estates, on the model of the Hagia Sophia. During his and his immediate successors' reign, the Nea played an important role in palace ceremonies, and at least until the reign of Constantine VII, the anniversary of its consecration was a major dynastic feast. At some point in the late 11th century it was turned into a monastery, and was known as the "New Monastery" (Νέα Μονή). Emperor Isaac II Angelos stripped it of much of its decoration, its furniture and liturgical vessels, and used them to restore the church of St Michael at Anaplous. The building continued to be used by the Latins and survived the Palaiologan period until after the Ottoman conquest of the city. The Ottomans however used it for gunpowder storage. Thus in 1490, when the building was struck by a lightning, it was destroyed and subsequently torn down. As a result, the only information we have about the church comes from literary evidence, especially the mid-10th century Vita Basilii, as well a few crude depictions in maps.

Description

As noted, not much is known about the details of the structure. The church was built with five domes: the central dome was dedicated to Christ while the four smaller ones housed chapels of the four other saints to whom the church was dedicated. The exact arrangement of the domes and the type of the church are disputed. Most scholars consider it to have been a cross-in-square structure, similar to the later Myrelaion and Lips Monastery churches. Indeed, the widespread use of this type throughout the Orthodox world, from the Balkans to Russia, is commonly ascribed to the prestige of this imperial building.

The church was the crowning achievement of Basil's building program, and he spared no expense to decorate it as lavishly as possible: other churches and structures in the capital, including the mausoleum of Justinian, were stripped, and the Imperial fleet employed with transporting marble for its construction, with the result that Syracuse, the main Byzantine stronghold in Sicily, was left unsupported and fell to the Arabs.

Basil's grandson, the Emperor Constantine VII Porphyrogenitus, gives the following description of the church's decoration in a laudatory ekphrasis:

The atrium of the church lay before its western entrance, and was decorated with two fountains of marble and porphyry. Two porticoes ran along the northern and southern sides of the church up to the tzykanistērion, and on the seaward (southern) side, a treasury and a sacristy were built. To the east of the church complex lay a garden, known as mesokēpion ("middle garden").

Relics
Along with the oratory of St Stephen in the Daphne Palace and the Church of the Virgin of the Pharos, the Nea was the chief repository of holy relics in the imperial palace. These included the sheepskin cloak of the prophet Elijah, the table of Abraham, at which he hosted three angels, the horn which the prophet Samuel had used to anoint David, and relics of Constantine the Great. After the 10th century, further relics were apparently moved there from other locations in the palace, including the "rod of Moses" from the Chrysotriklinos.

See also
History of Roman and Byzantine domes

References

Sources

External links
 3D reconstruction of the building at the Byzantium 1200 project

880s in the Byzantine Empire
9th-century churches
Destroyed churches in Turkey
Eastern Orthodox church buildings
Great Palace of Constantinople
Buildings and structures demolished in the 15th century
880